"The World's Greatest" is a song written and performed by American R&B singer R. Kelly. The song was originally featured on the soundtrack to the film Ali, and also appeared on bootleg copies of Kelly's unreleased album, Loveland, which later became a bonus disc to Chocolate Factory. Released as a single in November 2001, "The World's Greatest" became a hit in Europe, reaching number two in the Netherlands, number four in the United Kingdom, and the top 20 in nine other European countries. In the United States, it peaked at number 34 on the Billboard Hot 100.

Reception and awards
The song reached number 31 on the Billboard R&B chart. Its music video, which portrayed Kelly as a boxer, was in heavy rotation on channels like MTV and BET. In the UK, it peaked at number four.

Music video
The music video is directed by Bille Woodruff. Kelly is a boxer in this video, playing the part of Muhammad Ali, as this song was originally a tribute to him. There is no color in the video except for red, the hue of Kelly's boxing clothes.

Track listings

Australian CD single
 "The World's Greatest" (radio edit)
 "The World's Greatest" (album version)
 "The World's Greatest" (instrumental)
 "I Decided"

European CD single
 "The World's Greatest" (radio edit) – 3:56
 "The World's Greatest" (album version) – 4:36

UK CD single
 "The World's Greatest" (radio edit) – 3:56
 "The World's Greatest" (album version) – 4:36
 "I Decided" – 4:12

UK cassette single
 "The World's Greatest" (album version) – 4:36
 "I Decided" – 4:12

Charts and certifications

Weekly charts

Year-end charts

Certifications

Release history

References

2000s ballads
2002 singles
2001 songs
Jive Records singles
Music videos directed by Bille Woodruff
R. Kelly songs
Song recordings produced by R. Kelly
Songs about Muhammad Ali
Songs written by R. Kelly
UK Independent Singles Chart number-one singles